Aadu is a 2015 Indian slapstick comedy film, written and directed by Midhun Manuel Thomas. It was an adaptation from the Guy Richie film "Snatch" where the dog and diamond were replaced by the Goat and "Neela Koduveli". It was produced and distributed by Vijay Babu and Sandra Thomas through Friday Film House. The cast includes Jayasurya, Vijay Babu, Sunny Wayne, Vinayakan, Saiju Kurup, Dharmajan Bolgatty, Vineeth Mohan, Bhagath Manuel, Renji Panicker, Sandra Thomas, Chemban Vinod Jose, Indrans, Bijukuttan and Harikrishnan.

Aadu was released in India on 6 February 2015. Upon release, it received mixed response and under-performed at the box office. However, after its DVD release the reception towards the film were positive and in time attained a cult following. A sequel Aadu 2 was released in 2017, a third installment Aadu 3 has been announced for a release in 3D format. Aadu was re-released in Kerala on 16 March 2018.

Plot

The film opens in Bangkok with an ungainly gangster named Dude being roped in by his boss to fetch an exotic herb known as Neelakoduveli, which is believed to bring eternal fortune to its bearer. Somewhere in Kerala, Shaji Pappan is the captain of a tug-of-war team hailing from the High Range area in Idukki. The team are known officially as 'Winners Pothumukku'. All the members are illiterate young men who are slackers, by drinking alcohol and outing. They manage to win the tournament, and along with the cash prize and the trophy, they also receive a female goat. Lolan, one of the team members, names the goat 'Pinky'. Shaji has a tough past with females, which is revealed to be a result of his wife Mary eloping with his unfaithful driver Ponnapachan. He allows the female goat inside his van reluctantly, as he doesn't allow females in his van usually, after Arakkal Abu assures he will slaughter it and have it as a barbecue.

The decision lands them into a slew of hilarious problems, as the team crashes into a tree, with a coconut falling on the head of Captain Cleetus, leaving him with cognitive slippage. As the team expects Arakkal Abu to do the slaughter, his cowardice is revealed. This situational inconvenience makes Shaji Paappan mad, who determines to eliminate or eat the goat at any cost.

After a few failed attempts, they accidentally run into inspector Shameer. He is also known as Sarbath Shameer, for his habit of ramming the culprits' forehead on a lemon placed on a table, and drinking its juice. As Shameer interrogates the team on the grounds of drunken driving, Menaka Kanthan, an animal welfare activist, accuses the group for abusing and presses charges. However, the team are allowed to go.

In the meantime, Dude and his boys arrive in Kerala in search of Neelakkoduveli, which is now in possession of Satan Xavier, a high-profile drug dealer in the high range. Kanjavu Soman makes a deal with Dude to retrieve the herb from Xavier. En route, Soman was robbed of the chest containing Neelakkoduveli, by masked assailants wearing caps. He reports the mishap to Dude. Shaji Paappan and the team runs into the Dude' henchman they knock out Shaji and capture Abu along with Pinky as hostages. Because Dude believes Abu to be the thief, as he was wearing his traditional cap, similar to Soman's assailants.

Somewhere else, a veteran left-wing leader named P.P Sasi gets into legal trouble as he foolishly discloses the politically driven murder hits to the public. When the police comes to arrest him, Sasi escapes from them. As Shaji Pappan is worried about Abu, a ransom video sent to the team by Dude's boys, betrays the location of their hideout. Shaji and his friends rush to the place and rescues Abu and Pinky. However, they run into Shameer and in crossways with Dude, who madly opens fire. In the end, Abu and Pinky are captured once again.

With a new lead in hand, Shameer apprehends Soman and Hakkim, the right-hand men of P.P Sasi Aassaan, to counter his armed adversaries. Shaji Paappan unwillingly decides to seek help from his elder brother Thomas Paappan whom Shaji hates. As an iron-smith, Thomas Paappan arms the group with rifles to confront Dude and his thugs. The century-old rifles turns out to be useless. But they defeat Dude and save Abu and Pinky.

Refusing to give up, Dude pulls out his gun and points at Shaji. Thomas arrives and manages to shoot the gun away. Thomas appears to be a poor marksman and runs away from seeing the police beside the gang. Sasi, who was hiding in an empty water tank, is exposed out of his hiding. Shameer apprehends the Dude and Sasi's groups, leaving Shaji and friends on their own.

Shameer is being praised by his superior officer, for recovering the Neelakkoduveli. However, when the trunk is uncovering, there was the only cow dung. Satan Xavier ran out of luck due to the transfer of Neelakkoduveli, resulting in his weed forest being burned down by police. Shameer gets suspended due to his negligence, which then results in getting himself beaten up by the vengeful public.

Without being able to retrieve the herb, Dude decides to finish off Soman. In a flashback, facts oblivious to everybody else in the film universe is shown. Soman, didn't have the intention to hand over the Neelakkoduveli to Dude and switched the herb chest with a decoy trunk filled with dung. As he was getting away with the valuable chest, he runs into an elephant pit, accidentally throwing the chest outside. When Soman came back to his senses, he discovers that Pinky had eaten away the Neelakkoduveli from the popped open chest. The power of the exotic herb might have rendered Pinky auspicious, which might be the reason why the ewe lamb didn't get harmed.

Pappan finally manages to sell off Pinky to a butcher. On the sight of his friends' evoked grievances while the goat was being dragged away, he feels a stroke of sympathy. As he calls the goat, he meets a girl with the same name.

Cast

Reception
Upon release, the film received mixed to a negative response. Akhila of FilmiBeat stated "Film fails to meet the expectations raised by the first looks and promotion". Veeyen of nowrunning.com said "'Aadu Oru Bheekara Jeevi Aanu' is a fiasco of colossal proportions that is little more than a series of insipid conversations between supposedly hilarious characters. Suffering from some severely smug writing, 'Aadu Oru Bheekara Jeevi Aanu'" is iffy stuff that delivers none of the promises that it makes, which includes serving a few earnest laughs as well."

Music

The original soundtrack and background score were composed by Shaan Rahman, with lyrics by Manu Manjith.

Soundtrack

Background score

Sequel

A sequel called Aadu 2 was released on 22 December 2017 and was commercial success at the box office.

References

External links
 Official Facebook Page
 

2015 films
Films scored by Shaan Rahman
Indian comedy road movies
Indian action comedy films
Indian slapstick comedy films
2010s Malayalam-language films
2015 action comedy films
2010s comedy road movies
Malayalam films in series
 Films directed by Midhun Manuel Thomas
2015 directorial debut films
Indian sequel films